Murunj Dam (مرنج ڈیم) is a proposed dam located in Rajanpur District, Punjab, Pakistan.

References

Dams in Pakistan
Hydroelectric power stations in Pakistan
Rajanpur District
Dams in Punjab, Pakistan